Le Hardi ("the bold one") was the lead ship of her class of destroyers (torpilleur d'escadre) built for the  (French Navy) during the late 1930s. The ship was completed during the Battle of France in mid-1940 and her first mission was to help escort an incomplete battleship to French Morocco only days before the French signed an armistice with the Germans. She played a minor role in the Battle of Dakar in September, mostly laying smoke screens. Le Hardi helped to escort one of the battleships damaged by the British during their July attack on Mers-el-Kébir, French Algeria, back to France in November. She was reduced to reserve in mid-1942.

When the Germans occupied Vichy France after the Allies landed in French North Africa in November 1942 and tried to seize the French fleet, the destroyer was one of the ships scuttled to prevent their capture. Unrepaired, the ship was scuttled by them in 1945 in Italy and later scrapped.

Design and description
They were powered by two geared steam turbines, each driving one propeller shaft, using steam provided by four Sural-Penhöet forced-circulation boilers. The crew consisted of 10 officers and 177 enlisted men.

The main armament of the Le Hardi-class ships consisted of six Canon de  Modèle 1932 guns in three twin-gun mounts, one forward and a superfiring pair aft of the superstructure. Their anti-aircraft armament consisted of one twin mount for  Modèle 1925 guns and two twin mounts Hotchkiss  Modèle 1929 anti-aircraft machine guns. The ships carried one triple and two twin sets of  torpedo tubes, one pair on each broadside between the funnels as well as one triple mount aft of the rear funnel able to traverse to both sides. One depth charge chute was built into the stern that housed eight  depth charges. The other side of the stern was intended to be used for the handling gear for a "Ginocchio" anti-submarine torpedo, but this was removed before Le Hardi was completed.

Modifications
In late 1941 the twin Hotchkiss machine guns were repositioned on the quarterdeck and a pair of single mounts for  Hotchkiss anti-aircraft (AA) guns were installed in their place in front of the bridge. In addition a pair of single mounts for Browning 13.2-millimeter AA machine guns were added on platforms on the sides of the superfiring turret aft.

Construction and career
Ordered on 12 November 1935, Le Hardi was laid down by Ateliers et Chantiers de la Loire at their shipyard in Nantes on 20 May 1936. She was launched on 4 May 1938, commissioned on 1 December 1939, and completed on 31 May 1940, entering service two days later. The ship escorted the passenger ship  from La Pallice to Casablanca, French Morocco, and then steamed to Brest, France. On 28 July, Le Hardi and Épée sailed for Dakar, French West Africa. The destroyer departed Dakar for Casablanca on 30 September. The following months saw five of the Le Hardi-class ships ordered to Oran, French Algeria, to escort the battleship  that had been damaged during the attack on Mers-el-Kébir; Le Hardi arrived there on 25 October. Departing on 5 November, they arrived at Toulon three days later. All of the ships in the class were assigned to the 10th DT at this time, although only three were allowed to be in commission at any time in accordance with the rules imposed by the  Italian and German Armistice Commissions.

The ship escorted troop transports between Algiers, French Algeria, and Marseille 3–5 July. Le Hardi was reduced to reserve on 20 May 1942. When the Germans attempted to capture the French ships in Toulon on 27 November 1942, Le Hardi was scuttled by her crew. The Italians refloated her on 12 June 1943 and redesignated her as FR37. On 6 September she departed Toulon under tow for Genoa, Italy; she was captured by the German en route in Savona, Italy, after the Italian armistice on 9 September. Unrepaired, the ship was scuttled in Genoa on 20 April 1945 and later scrapped.

Notes

References

External links
 Le Hardi at uboat.net

Le Hardi-class destroyers
Naval ships of France captured by Italy during World War II
1938 ships
World War II warships scuttled at Toulon